Mehboob Shah is a Pakistani politician who had been a member of the National Assembly of Pakistan from August 2018 till Janus 2023.

Political career
He was elected to the National Assembly of Pakistan as a candidate of Pakistan Tehreek-e-Insaf (PTI) from Constituency NA-6 (Lower Dir-I) in 2018 Pakistani general election. He received 63,440 votes and defeated Molana Asadullah, a candidate of Muttahida Majlis-e-Amal (MMA).

References

Living people
Pakistani MNAs 2018–2023
Year of birth missing (living people)